The Missionary: An Indian Tale (1811) is a sentimental romance novela by Irish author Sydney Owenson (Lady Morgan).

Notes

External links
 The Missionary: An Indian Tale Google book

Irish romance novels
1811 novels
19th-century Irish novels
Works about missionaries